Bryan Sholomicki (born 8 February 1981) is an ice sledge hockey player who was on the Canadian team that earned a silver medal in Para ice hockey at the 2018 Winter Paralympics. His disability is due to a motorcycle accident.

References

External links 
 
 

1981 births
Living people
Canadian sledge hockey players
Canadian amputees
Paralympic silver medalists for Canada
Para ice hockey players at the 2018 Winter Paralympics
Medalists at the 2018 Winter Paralympics
Sportspeople from Winnipeg
Paralympic medalists in sledge hockey
Paralympic sledge hockey players of Canada